Johanna Elena Rojas Fadul  (born September 5, 1985) is a Colombian actress and model. She made herself known in the Colombian series Padres e Hijos, and as Daniela Barrera in the Telemundo's series Sin senos sí hay paraíso.

Filmography

References

External links 
 

1985 births
Living people
Colombian telenovela actresses
Colombian people of Lebanese descent
Colombian television actresses
21st-century Colombian actresses